Koška is a municipality in Osijek-Baranja County, Croatia. There are 3,980 inhabitants, 89.5% of whom are Croats, Serbs 6.78% and Slovaks 1.38% (2011 census). The rest of population is made up mainly of Slovaks and Serbs.

The settlements in the municipality are:
Andrijevac, Branimirovac, Breznica Našička, Koška, Ledenik, Lug Subotički, Niza, Normanci, Ordanja, Topoline.

References

External links

Municipalities of Croatia